Trudy Morgan (born 1966) is the first African woman to be awarded a Fellowship of the Institution of Civil Engineers (FICE) and the first female Vice President of the Sierra Leone Institution of Engineers.

Born to Sierra Leone Creole parents in Liverpool, United Kingdom, Morgan and her family moved back to Sierra Leone where she received her education in civil engineering.

In 2015, Morgan co-founded the non-profit Sierra Leone Women Engineers, to support women in engineering. Morgan is also the Program Director for Hilton Freetown Cape Sierra Hotel,  a member of the Professional Engineers Review Council and the UK's Institution of Civil Engineers International Representative to Sierra Leone.

References

External links 
Fellowship of the Institution of Civil Engineers (FICE)
Sierra Leone Institution of Engineers

1966 births
Living people
Sierra Leone Creole people
Sierra Leonean engineers